The Kilkenny People is a local newspaper circulated in County Kilkenny, Ireland.

Popular in Kilkenny City and County, it competes with the Kilkenny Reporter and The Munster Express in the south of the county. The Kilkenny People is published on Wednesdays every week and is owned by Iconic Newspapers, which acquired Johnston Press's titles in the Republic of Ireland in 2014. The paper is printed in three sections, dealing with news, property and sport. Originally set up as a newspaper for supporters of Charles Stewart Parnell, it survived and prospered while others folded and closed.

In 1919, British Forces removed the printing press and printing equipment from the newspaper's offices in Kilkenny City. This move prevented messages of Irish Independence being communicated throughout the region. The move caused public outrage at the time however it was not long before the newspaper was back printing again. 

The paper is currently edited by Sam Matthews. Previous editors include Brian Keyes, Tom Molloy, Sean Hurley and John Kerry Keane.

Reporters include Mary Cody, Christopher Dunne and Sian Moloughney.

James Joyce referred to it in his novel Ulysses.

Circulation
Circulation has been on the decline in recent years. According to the Audit Bureau of Circulations, the paper had an average weekly circulation of 17,578 for the first six months of 2006. Circulation declined to 10,591 for the period July 2012 to December 2012, this represented a fall of 8% on a year-on-year basis.

References

External links

People
Mass media in County Kilkenny
Newspapers published in the Republic of Ireland
Weekly newspapers published in Ireland